John Pont (November 13, 1927 – July 1, 2008) was an American football player and coach. He served as head coach at Miami University, Yale University, Northwestern University and Indiana University.

Early life
Pont was born on November 13, 1927 in Canton, Ohio to Bautista and Suzannah Pont. He graduated from Timken High School in Canton. As an undergraduate at Miami University, Pont was an outstanding halfback, playing for coaches Woody Hayes and Ara Parseghian, and was a member of the Sigma Chi fraternity. After a serving a tour as a Navy submariner, Pont played professional football in Canada. He and several of his "Cradle of Coaches" compatriots are the subject of the book Fields of Honor, written by Pont's niece, Sally Pont.

Career

Playing
After playing college football at Miami University, Pont went to Canada and played with Toronto Balmy Beach Beachers of the Ontario Rugby Football Union, where he won the Imperial Oil Trophy as league MVP in 1952.

Coaching
He was the only Indiana University coach to take a team to the Rose Bowl. Later in his career, Pont was recruited to start a football program at Cincinnati's College of Mount St. Joseph. He later served as coach and consultant in creating a semi-professional football league in Japan. He was honored as NCAA Division I-A coach of the year in 1967, the year his Hoosiers appeared in the Rose Bowl. He was a member of the Cradle of Coaches and the Miami and Indiana Athletic Halls of Fame as well as Mid-American Conference Hall of Fame and the Indiana Football Hall of Fame.

Death

Pont died at his home in Oxford, Ohio on July 1, 2008.

Head coaching record

College

References

External links
 
 Cradle of Coaches Archive: A Legacy of Excellence - John Pont, Miami University Libraries
 John Pont Collection, Cradle of Coaches Archive, Miami University Libraries

1927 births
2008 deaths
American football halfbacks
Indiana Hoosiers football coaches
Miami RedHawks football coaches
Miami RedHawks football players
Mount St. Joseph Lions football coaches
Northwestern Wildcats athletic directors
Northwestern Wildcats football coaches
Ontario Rugby Football Union players
Toronto Balmy Beach Beachers players
Yale Bulldogs football coaches
High school football coaches in Ohio
Sportspeople from Canton, Ohio
Burials at Oxford Cemetery, Oxford, Ohio
Players of American football from Canton, Ohio